Shadabad-e Sofla (also Romanized as Shādābād-e Soflá) is a village in Shirez Rural District, Bisotun District, Harsin County, Kermanshah Province, Iran. At the 2006 census, its population was 321, in 80 families.

References 

Populated places in Harsin County